100-series highways may refer to:
100-series highways (Nova Scotia)
Primary highways in Quebec